Heye Town is a rural town in Guiyang County, Hunan, China. It borders Lutang Town in the east and north, Jinjiang Town in the south, and Fangyuan Town in the west.

Administrative division
As of 2011, it include 15 villages: Xinshi, Xintang, Gantang, Laopu, Lianglukou, Tanxi, Gaoshan, Shuibian, Shangchong, Heye, Shantian, Tangjiadong, Shuiyuan, Xiagu, and Tangjia, and 2 communities: Shentangyu and Heye Coal Mine.

History
In 1527 during the Ming dynasty, it known as "Chaozongli". In 1640, it belonged to Jinshan Township. In 1930 it came under the jurisdiction of the Second District of Guiyang County. After the founding of the Communist State in 1956, Heye Township was established. In July 1961 it was renamed "Heye People's Commune". In July 1996 it was upgraded to a town.

Geography

The town has a subtropical humid monsoon climate. The frost-free period averaged 200 days per year. The average annual sunshine is 1800 hours. The annual average precipitation is 1400 to 1700 mm.

Economy
The town's main industries are agriculture and mining. Coal and graphite are major mineral resources. The main cash crops are rice, konjac, ginger, chili pepper and kiwifruit.

Education
As of 2011, there are 10 kindergartens, 15 primary schools and one middle school in the town.

Culture
Huaguxi is the most influence local theater.

Attractions
The main attractions are the Chaoquan and Jinxianzhai.

Transportation
The Provincial Highway S214 passes across the town north to south.

See also 
 List of township-level divisions of Hunan

References

External links
 

Divisions of Guiyang County
Guiyang